Dexter Stacey (born November 9, 1992) is a Canadian professional stock car racing driver who competes in the NASCAR Pinty's Series as well as part-time in the NASCAR Xfinity Series, driving the No. 66 Chevrolet Camaro for MBM Motorsports. He has also previously competed in the NASCAR Truck Series and the ARCA Menards Series. 

Stacey became the youngest driver to ever race in the Pinty's Series at the age of 16 in 2009 when it was known as the NASCAR Canadian Tire Series.

Racing career

Early career
Stacey began racing in go karts at the age of 4. He then moved up to race in dirt modifieds at age 8 running well in several races. He also competed in various ice racing events in his early teens winning a few races throughout his 5-year span in that discipline.

NASCAR

Pinty's Series

Stacey made his NASCAR debut on May 23, 2009 in the season opening NASCAR Canadian Tire Series race at Saint-Eustache at 16, becoming the youngest driver to race in the series and the youngest driver to race in NASCAR until his mark was eclipsed in 2011 when NASCAR lowered the age limit to 15. He contended for Rookie of the Year honors against Joey Hanssen, finishing second in the rookie points. Stacey found very little success in his first year with his underfunded WJS Motorsports team, with no top 10s and finishing 14th in the points.

In 2010, Stacey returned to the Canadian Tire series with sponsorship from Bully's Truck Stop. Stacey was fairly better that year than last year, finishing in the top 10 in points in 10th despite not having any top 10s once again.

In 2011, Stacey would have a career season in the Canadian Tire series. Stacey earned his first career top 10 in the fourth race of the season in Mosport, finishing 7th. Stacey went on to score 4 more solid top 15 finishes and despite still not leading a lap, he finished 10th in the points for the second year in row.

In 2012, Stacey made an attempt to run the full schedule in the NASCAR Canadian Tire series, but he and his team had a severe amount of financial issues that year. He and the team was only able to manage enough sponsorship to run 5 of the 12 races that year. However, in his next to last run of the season, Stacey earned a career best 5th-place finish at Barrie Speedway in Ontario, his first and only career top 5 finish. Other than that, it was a dismal season for Stacey and WJS Motorsports as they finished 30th in the points.

Xfinity Series

During his part-time Canadian Tire series season, Stacey made his part-time leap into the Nationwide Series in 2012 as well. Stacey made his Nationwide debut at Watkins Glen dropping out during the race after 25 laps for a handling issue and finishing 32nd. He then made his 2nd start as his home event at Circuit Gilles Villeneuve at Montreal, Quebec, but crashed twice and dropped out, finishing 35th. Stacey ran five more races in 2012 that year running with Go Green Racing with a best finish of 24th at Chicagoland. Stacey had a hard time his first 7 career Nationwide series races in 2012 with 3 DNF's and was well off the pace as well. He finished his first part-time season in the Nationwide Series 48th in points.

In January 2013, Stacey announced that he went for 2013 NASCAR Rookie of the Year honors in the Nationwide Series in 2013 after forming KH Motorsports. He drove the No. 92 Ford for the season with sponsorship from Maddie's Place in hopes of running the full season. Unfortunately, two bad things happened during the season. First, at Richmond, he suffered a concussion after a hard crash in turn 1 early in the race and had to miss the next race at Talladega. He also had a similar accident at Michigan and had to have relief from Tim Andrews at Road America. Then, his team started running low on funding and Maddie's Place left the team for a short period of time, forcing Stacey to start skipping races. He did attempt to qualify for Mid-Ohio with the No. 46 team for The Motorsports Group, but failed to qualify. Maddie's Place eventually returned to the No. 92 team late in the year and attempted the final 4 races, only to qualify for Texas and Homestead and missing Charlotte and Phoenix. Overall, Stacey had no top 20 finishes and DNQ'd 5 times with a best finish of 21st in the Iowa Spring race and finished the season 30th in points.

In November 2016, Stacey announced that he would return to the series, now known as the Xfinity Series, driving the No. 70 for Derrike Cope Racing in the last three races of the season.

On January 26, 2023, it was announced that Stacey would return to the Xfinity Series for the first time since 2016 and would drive the No. 66 car for MBM Motorsports in the season-opener at Daytona.

Truck Series
After not running a national series race in 2014, Stacey made his Camping World Truck Series debut in the WinStar World Casino & Resort 350 at Texas Motor Speedway, driving the No. 50 Chevrolet Silverado for MAKE Motorsports.

In October 2016, Stacey replaced Travis Kvapil in the Texas Roadhouse 200 at Martinsville in the middle of race and finished 27th. However, since Kvapil started the race, he is officially credited with the 27th-place finish.

ARCA Racing Series
Stacey competed in one ARCA Racing Series event, in 2013, driving the No. 06 Chevrolet for Mike Harmon Racing at Daytona. He started 39th and finished 20th.

Motorsports career results

NASCAR
(key) (Bold – Pole position awarded by qualifying time. Italics – Pole position earned by points standings or practice time. * – Most laps led.)

Xfinity Series

Camping World Truck Series

Pinty's Series

 Season still in progress
 Ineligible for series points

ARCA Racing Series
(key) (Bold – Pole position awarded by qualifying time. Italics – Pole position earned by points standings or practice time. * – Most laps led.)

References

External links
 
 

1992 births
Living people
People from Montérégie
Racing drivers from Quebec
Canadian racing drivers
NASCAR drivers
ARCA Menards Series drivers
Canadian Mohawk people